The Newmarket Handicap is a Victoria Racing Club Group 1 Thoroughbred open handicap horse race over a distance of 1200 metres, at Flemington Racecourse, Melbourne, Australia on Super Saturday in March during the VRC Autumn Racing Carnival. Prize money is A$1,500,000.

History
The Newmarket Handicap is considered Australia's premier sprint race. First run in 1874, the brainchild of VRC committeeman Captain Frederick Standish who thought a "short and merry" race over six furlongs would add interest to the Club's autumn program.

The Newmarket Handicap is the only Flemington race, apart from the Melbourne Cup, in which up to 24 horses are permitted to start.

1954 racebook

Distance
 1874–1972 - 6 furlongs (~1200 metres)
 1973 onwards - 1200 metres

Grade
 1874–1979 - Principal Race
 1979 onwards  - Group 1

Venue
In 2007 the race was run at Caulfield Racecourse due to refurbishment work at Flemington Racecourse.

Records
Five horses in the history of the event have won the Newmarket Handicap twice.

 Aspen - 1880, 1881
 Gothic - 1927, 1928
 Correct - 1960, 1961
 Razor Sharp - 1982, 1983
 Redkirk Warrior - 2017, 2018

The most successful trainer has been Bart Cummings with eight wins – (1972, 1973, 1975, 1978, 1979, 1981, 1990, 1991).

The most successful jockey has been Damien Oliver with three wins – Alinghi (2005), Toledo (2001) and Schillaci (1992).

The race record is held by 2011 winner Black Caviar who posted the time of 1:07.36.

Winners

 2023 - In Secret
 2022 - Roch 'n' Horse
 2021 - Zoutori
 2020 - Bivouac
 2019 - Sunlight
 2018 - Redkirk Warrior
 2017 - Redkirk Warrior
 2016 - The Quarterback
 2015 - Brazen Beau
 2014 - Lankan Rupee
 2013 - Shamexpress
 2012 - Hay List
 2011 - Black Caviar
 2010 - Wanted
 2009 - Scenic Blast
 2008 - Weekend Hussler
 2007 - Miss Andretti
 2006 - Takeover Target
 2005 - Alinghi
 2004 - Exceed And Excel
 2003 - Belle Du Jour
 2002 - Rubitano
 2001 - Toledo
 2000 - Miss Pennymoney
 1999 - Isca
 1998 - General Nediym
 1997 - Ruffles
 1996 - Brawny Spirit
 1995 - All Our Mob
 1994 - Mookta
 1993 - Primacy
 1992 - Schillaci
 1991 - Shaftesbury Avenue
 1990 - Gold Trump
 1989 - Grandiose
 1988 - Special
 1987 - Placid Ark
 1986 - Lockley's Tradition
 1985 - Red Tempo
 1984 - Heron Bridge
 1983 - Razor Sharp
 1982 - Razor Sharp
 1981 - Elounda Bay
 1980 - Dor Kon
 1979 - Better Beyond
 1978 - Maybe Mahal
 1977 - Desirable
 1976 - Toy Show
 1975 - Cap D'antibes
 1974 - Coolalinga
 1973 - Century
 1972 - Crown
 1971 - Baguette
 1970 - Black Onyx
 1969 - Begonia Belle
 1968 - Manihi
 1967 - Nebo Road
 1966 - Bowl King
 1965 - Ripa
 1964 - Rashlore
 1963 - Our Cobber
 1962 - Victorious
 1961 - Correct
 1960 - Correct
 1959 - Gold Stakes
 1958 - My Hour
 1957 - King's Fair
 1956 - Kingster
 1955 - Swynphilos
 1954 - Birdwood
 1953 - Cultured
 1952 - Cromwell
 1951 - Carnage
 1950 - High Jip
 1949 - Reperio
 1948 - Royal Gem
 1947 - Gay Queen
 1946 - Bernborough
 1945 - Three Wheeler
 1944 - Orteli
 1943 - Denko
 1942 - Kelos
 1941 - All Veil
 1940 - Mildura
 1939 - El Golea
 1938 - Ajax
 1937 - Aurie's Star
 1936 - Regular Bachelor
 1935 - Count Ito
 1934 - Foursome
 1933 - Waltzing Lily
 1932 - Lady Linden
 1931 - Parkwood
 1930 - Greenline
 1929 - St. Ardent
 1928 - Gothic
 1927 - Gothic
 1926 - Heroic
 1925 - Valiard
 1924 - Quintus
 1923 - Sunburst
 1922 - Rostrum
 1921 - Blue Cross
 1920 - Red Dome
 1919 - Molly's Robe
 1918 - Cetigne
 1917 - Polycrates
 1916 - Amata
 1915 - Blague
 1914 - Iownit
 1913 - Relievo
 1912 - Desire
 1911 - Queen Of Scots
 1910 - Mala
 1909 - Soultline
 1908 - Scotland
 1907 - Ebullition
 1906 - Pendant
 1905 - Playaway
 1904 - Mairp
 1903 - Chantress
 1902 - Sir Foote
 1901 - Wakeful
 1900 - The Watchdog
 1899 - Forest
 1898 - Amiable
 1897 - Carlton
 1896 - Maluma
 1895 - Laundress
 1894 - Hova
 1893 - Fortunatus
 1892 - Wild Rose
 1891 - Bungebah
 1890 - Churchill
 1889 - Sedition
 1888 - Cranbrook
 1887 - Lochiel
 1886 - William Tell
 1885 - Coronet
 1884 - Malua
 1883 - Tyropean
 1882 - Hyacinth
 1881 - Aspen
 1880 - Aspen
 1879 - Diomede
 1878 - Lady Ellen
 1877 - Tom Kirk
 1876 - Sultan
 1875 - Calumny
 1874 - Maid Of Avenel

See also
 List of Australian Group races
 Group races

References

Group 1 stakes races in Australia
Open sprint category horse races
Flemington Racecourse